Victorian State League Division 4 is the seventh level of soccer in Victoria, Australia, and the eighth nationally. The league is split into four geographic conferences – North, West, South and East. The league replaced Provisional Leagues 1 and 2 at the end of the 2012 season.

The winners of each conference are promoted to Victorian State League Division 3, while the bottom two placed sides in each conference are relegated to their respective conference in State League 5.

Member clubs 2023
The following 47 clubs from three conferences of 12 and one conference of 11 will be competing in the Victorian State League Division 4 during the 2023 season.

State League Division 4 North

State League Division 4 West

State League Division 4 South

State League Division 4 East

References

External links
 Football Federation Victoria Website

4